The Irish Guards (IG) is one of the Foot Guards regiments of the British Army and is part of the Guards Division. Together with the Royal Irish Regiment, it is one of the two Irish infantry regiments in the British Army. The regiment has participated in campaigns in the First World War, the Second World War, the Iraq War and the War in Afghanistan as well as numerous other operations throughout its history. The Irish Guards claim six Victoria Cross recipients, four from the First World War and two from the Second World War.

History

The Irish Guards were formed on 1 April 1900 by order of Queen Victoria to commemorate the Irishmen who fought in the Second Boer War for the British Empire.

First World War

Following the outbreak of the First World War, 1st Battalion Irish Guards was deployed to France almost immediately, and they remained on the Western Front for the duration of the war. During the early part of the war, the Battalion took part in the Battle of Mons and formed the Allied rearguard during the Great Retreat. The Battalion then took part in one of the bloodiest battles of 1914, the First Battle of Ypres, which began on 19 October, inflicting major casualties among the old Regular Army.

The 1st Battalion was involved in fighting for the duration of 'First Ypres', at Langemarck, Gheluvelt and Nonne Bosschen. The 1st Battalion suffered huge casualties between 1–8 November holding the line against near defeat by German forces, while defending Klein Zillebeke.

In May 1915, the 1st Battalion took part in the Battle of Festubert, though did not see much action. Two further battalions were formed for the regiment in July. In September that year, all three battalions took part in the Battle of Loos, which lasted from 25 September until early October.

The Irish Guards went into action again on 1 July 1916 when the Battle of the Somme began. The 1st Battalion took part in an action at Flers–Courcelette where they suffered severe casualties in the attack in the face of withering fire from the German machine-guns. The Battalion also took part in the action at Morval before they were relieved by the 2nd Battalion.

In 1917 the Irish Guards took part in the Battle of Pilckem which began on 31 July during the Third Battle of Ypres. The Irish Guards also took part in the Battle of Cambrai that year. In 1918 the regiment fought in a number of engagements during the Second Battle of the Somme, including at Arras and Albert. The regiment then went on to take part in a number of battles during the British offensives against the Hindenburg Line. On 11 November 1918 the Armistice with Germany was signed. The 1st Battalion was at Maubeuge when the Armistice was signed.

The regiment's continued existence was threatened briefly when Winston Churchill, who served as Secretary of State for War between 1919 and 1921, sought the elimination of the Irish Guards and Welsh Guards as an economy measure. This proposal, however, did not find favour in government or army circles and was dropped. Between the wars, the regiment was deployed at various times to Turkey, Gibraltar, Egypt and Palestine.

Second World War

During the Second World War, the regiment fought in Norway, France, North Africa, Italy, Belgium, Netherlands and Germany. The regiment first saw combat during the Norwegian Campaign. Following a challenging sea voyage to Norway, the 1st Battalion arrived in May 1940 and fought for two days at the town of Pothus before they were forced to retreat. The Irish Guards conducted a fighting withdrawal and served as the Allied rearguard.

The Battalion was evacuated along with the rest of the expeditionary force in June. While the 1st Battalion was fighting in Norway, the 2nd Battalion was deployed to the Hook of Holland to cover the evacuation of the Dutch Royal Family and Government in May 1940. The 2nd Battalion was then deployed to France and ordered to defend the port of Boulogne. The guardsmen held out against overwhelming odds for three days, buying valuable time for the Dunkirk Evacuation, before they were evacuated themselves. In November 1942, during the Second World War, Jean, Grand Duke of Luxembourg joined the British Army as a volunteer in the Irish Guards.

In March 1943 the 1st Battalion landed, with the rest of the 24th Guards Brigade, in Tunisia, to fight in the final stages of the campaign in North Africa. The Battalion saw extensive action while fighting through Tunisia and was subsequently deployed to the Italian Front in December of that year. The Battalion took part in the Anzio landings on 22 January 1944. They also participated in the fierce fighting around the Allied beachhead and suffered severe casualties fighting off a German counterattack at Campoleone after which the depleted battalion was returned to the UK in April.

The Irish Guards returned to France in June 1944 when the 2nd and 3rd Battalions took part in the Normandy Campaign. Both battalions served as part of the Guards Armoured Division and took part in the attempt to capture Caen as part of Operation Goodwood. They also saw action in the Mont Pincon area. On 29 August, the 3rd Battalion crossed the Seine and began the advance into Belgium with the rest of the Guards Armoured Division towards Brussels.

The Irish Guards were part of the ground force of Operation Market Garden, 'Market' being the airborne assault and 'Garden' the ground attack. The Irish Guards led the vanguard of XXX Corps in their advance towards Arnhem, which was the objective of the British 1st Airborne Division, furthest from XXX Corps' start line. The Corps crossed the Belgian-Dutch border, advancing from Neerpelt on 17 September but the Irish Guards encountered heavy resistance which slowed the advance. Following the conclusion of Market Garden, the Irish Guards remained in the Netherlands until taking part in the Allied advance into Germany and seeing heavy action during the Rhineland Campaign with Guardsman Edward Charlton winning the final Victoria Cross to be awarded in the European theatre.

1945 – 2019

After the war, the regiment was reduced to a single battalion. In 1947, the 1st Battalion deployed to Palestine to perform internal security duties there. It was then posted to the Suez Canal Zone in Egypt, remaining there until the British withdrawal in 1956. The regiment continued to serve in troubled regions such as Cyprus and Aden throughout the 1950s and 1960s. During this time they were also part of the British Army of the Rhine (BAOR) in Germany on a number of occasions. They also served as the garrison of Hong Kong from 1970 to 1972.

The Irish Guards were one of the few regiments in the British Army initially exempt from service in Northern Ireland during The Troubles. However, a Provisional Irish Republican Army (IRA) bomb blasted a bus carrying members of the regiment band to Chelsea Barracks in October 1981. 39 people (23 soldiers and 16 others) were wounded and two civilians were killed. 1992 saw the regiment finally carry out its first tour-of-duty in Northern Ireland, based in County Fermanagh.

The Irish Guards were involved in the Balkans Conflicts when they were deployed to Macedonia and Kosovo in 1999 and were the first British unit to enter the Kosovan capital city of Pristina on 12 June. The regiment played a significant role in the initial stages of the Iraq War as part of the 7th Armoured Brigade and they led the British advance into Basra in March 2003. The Irish Guards deployed to Iraq on Operation Telic 10 in 2007. In 2010, the regiment deployed on their first tour of duty to Afghanistan. Number 2 Company deployed to Afghanistan in 2013 as a Brigade Operations Company.

In 2014 the entire regiment deployed to Cyprus to patrol the buffer zone as part of Operation Tosca 20. Following the Manchester Arena bombing, the Irish Guards were deployed in London to guard key locations, including the Ministry of Defence building in Whitehall, as part of Operation Temperer. Later that year Number 1 Company deployed to the Falkland Islands as the Roulement Infantry Company while Number 2 Company deployed to Thailand on an overseas training exercise where they worked alongside the Thai Army.

2019 – 2020 
December 2019 saw the Irish Guards deploy on two operations concurrently. Number 1 Company deployed to South Sudan on Operation Trenton and the rest of the Battalion deployed to Iraq on Operation Shader, training Iraqi Security Forces in the mission to defeat Daesh. However, the deployment rapidly changed in January 2020 with the escalation of the 2019–20 Persian Gulf crisis following the American strike on Major General Qasem Soleimani. The Irish Guards' mission changed from training to force protection in order to protect British assets in Iraq from possible retaliation by Iran. Eventual de-escalation saw the Irish Guards resume their original mission.

Current role and organisation
In the light infantry role the 1st Battalion comprised five companies; Nos 1, 2, 3 and 4 Companies, and the Headquarters Company.  Following the Integrated Review and after the Queen’s Birthday Parade 2022, 1st Battalion took on the security force assistance role for 4 years. With a much-reduced establishment, this role required a substantial readjustment to the battalion. Concurrently, the Irish Guards raised two public duties incremental companies (PDICs).  These are Numbers 9 and 12 Companies, Public Duties Incremental Companies, taking on Irish Guardsmen fresh out of the Infantry Training Centre before the young soldiers progress to the 1st Battalion.  Number 12 Company carries on the traditions of the former 2nd Battalion, Irish Guards.  Finally there is Number 15 (Loos) Company in the Army Reserve, based at Flodden Road, London.

Recruitment
The regiment recruits in Northern Ireland and among residents of Irish extraction in mainland Britain. Although restrictions in Ireland's Defence Act make it illegal to induce, procure or persuade enlistment of any citizen of Ireland into the military of another state, people from the Republic do frequently enlist in the Regiment.

Uniform

Like the other Foot Guards regiments, the "Home Service Dress" of the Irish Guards is a scarlet tunic and bearskin. Buttons are worn in fours, reflecting the regiment's position as the fourth most senior Guards regiment, and the collar is adorned with embroided shamrock. They also sport a St. Patrick's blue plume on the right side of the bearskin.  A plume of St Patrick's blue was selected because blue is the colour of the mantle and sash of the Order of St Patrick, a chivalric order, founded by George III of the United Kingdom for the Kingdom of Ireland in February 1783 from which the regiment also draws its cap star and motto.  The Irish Guards pipers wear saffron kilts, green hose with saffron flashes and heavy black shoes known as brogues with no spats, a rifle green doublet with buttons in fours and a hat known as a caubeen.The regimental capstar is worn over the piper's right eye and is topped by a blue hackle. A green cloak with four silver buttons is worn over the shoulders and is secured by two green straps that cross over the chest.

In "Walking-out Dress", the Irish Guards can be identified by the green band on their forage caps. Officers also traditionally carry a blackthorn cane.

Like the other Guards regiments, they wear a khaki beret with the blue/red/blue Household Division backing patch on it. On the beret, ranks from Guardsman to Lance Sergeant wear a brass or staybrite cap badge, Sergeants and Colour Sergeants wear a bi-metal cap badge, Warrant Officers wear a silver plate gilt and enamel cap badge and commissioned officers of the regiment wear an embroidered cap badge.

Prince William, who was then Colonel of the Irish Guards, wore the uniform of the Irish Guards at his wedding to Catherine Middleton.

Motto
The regiment takes its motto, Quis Separabit?, or "Who shall separate us?" from the Order of St Patrick.

Nickname
The Irish Guards are known throughout the British Army as "the Micks" or "Fighting Micks." An earlier nickname, "Bob's Own", after Field Marshal Lord Roberts has fallen into disuse. The term "Mick" is an offensive term for a person of Irish descent; however it is proudly used internally within the regiment and has no negative connotation when referring to the Irish Guards.

Training

Recruits to the Guards Division go through a thirty-week training programme at the Infantry Training Centre (ITC). The training is two weeks more than the training for the Regular infantry regiments of the British Army; the extra training, carried out throughout the course, is devoted to drill and ceremonies.

Mascot

Since 1902, an Irish Wolfhound has been presented as a mascot to the regiment by the Irish Wolfhound Club, who originally hoped the publicity would increase the breed's popularity with the public. The first mascot was called Brian Boru.

In 1961, the wolfhound was admitted to the select club of "official" Army mascots, entitling him to the services of the Royal Army Veterinary Corps, as well as quartering and food at public expense. Originally, the mascot was in the care of a drummer boy, but is now looked after by one of the regiment's drummers and his family. The Irish Guards are the only Guards regiment permitted to have their mascot lead them on parade. During Trooping the Colour, the mascot marches only from Wellington Barracks as far as Horse Guards Parade. He then falls out of the formation and does not participate in the Trooping itself. Domhnall, the regiment's seventeenth mascot, retired back to Ireland, in 2019.

Traditions and affiliations

St Patrick's Day is the traditional regimental celebration. It is customary for the regiment to begin the day's celebrations with the Guardsmen being woken by their officers and served gunfire. Fresh shamrock is then presented to members of the regiment, whether they are in the UK or abroad on operations.

Except in wartime, the presentation of shamrock is traditionally made by a member of the Royal Family. This task was first performed in 1901 by Queen Alexandra and later by Queen Elizabeth The Queen Mother. After the latter's death, the presentation was made by the Princess Royal. Starting in 2012, the presentation has been made by the then Duchess of Cambridge.

In 1950 George VI marked the fiftieth anniversary of the formation of the Irish Guards by presenting the shamrocks on St Patrick's Day. This honour was mirrored by King George's surviving wife, Queen Elizabeth The Queen Mother, fifty years later when she presented shamrocks to the regiment on St. Patrick's Day in their centenary year of 2000.

Battle honours

The regiment's battle honours are as follows:
First World War: Mons, Retreat from Mons, Marne 1914, Aisne 1914, Ypres 1914 and 17, Langemarck 1914, Battle of Gheluvelt, Nonne Bosschen, Festubert 1915, Loos, Somme 1916 and 1918, Flers–Courcelette, Morval, Pilckem, Poelcapelle, Passchendaele, Cambrai 1917 and 1918, St. Quentin, Lys, Hazebrouck, Albert 1918, Bapaume 1918, Arras 1918, Scarpe 1918, Drocourt-Quéant, Hindenburg Line, Canal du Nord, Selle, Sambre, France and Flanders 1914–18
Second World War:
 North-West Europe: Pothus, Norway 1940, Boulogne 1940, Cagny, Mont Pincon, Neerpelt, Nijmegen, Aam, Rhineland, Hochwald, Rhine, Bentheim, North-West Europe 1940 1944–45,
 North Africa: Medjez Plain, Djebel bou Aoukaz, North Africa 1943,
 Italy: Anzio, Aprilia, Carroceto, Italy 1943–44
Al Basrah 2003, Iraq 2003

Victoria Cross recipients
Guardsman Edward Colquhoun Charlton, 2nd Battalion, The Irish Guards
Lance Corporal John Kenneally, 1st Battalion, The Irish Guards
Acting Lieutenant Colonel James Marshall, Irish Guards (attached to the 16th Battalion, The Lancashire Fusiliers)
Lance Sergeant John Moyney, 2nd Battalion, The Irish Guards
Lance Corporal Michael O'Leary, 1st Battalion, The Irish Guards
Private Thomas Woodcock, 2nd Battalion, The Irish Guards

Notable members
Field Marshal The Earl Alexander of Tunis 
The Reverend Francis Browne  
General Sir Mark Carleton-Smith  (Chief of the General Staff)
The Lord Moyola  (politician)
Jean, Grand Duke of Luxembourg
Arthur Charles Evans  (writer)
Sir John Gorman  (politician)
Lieutenant John Kipling (only son of Rudyard Kipling)
 Sir Patrick Leigh Fermor  (travel writer)
Nigel Morgan (security consultant)
Lieutenant Colonel The Hon. George Henry Morris
Liam O'Flaherty (Irish novelist)
Brigadier Joe Vandeleur 
Lieutenant Colonel Giles Vandeleur

Colonels-in-Chief
King Edward VII assumed the colonelcy-in-chief of the regiment on his accession, and subsequent monarchs have also been colonel-in-chief.

Regimental Colonels

British Army regiments typically have an honorary colonel, often a member of the Royal Family or a prominent retired military officer with connections to the regiment.

The Irish Guards colonels have been:

Field Marshal The Earl Roberts  – appointed 17 October 1900
Field Marshal The Earl Kitchener  – appointed 15 November 1914
Field Marshal The Earl of Ypres  – appointed 6 June 1916
Field Marshal The Earl of Cavan  – appointed 23 May 1925
Field Marshal The Earl Alexander of Tunis  – appointed 28 August 1946
General Sir Basil Eugster  – appointed 17 June 1969
General The Grand Duke of Luxembourg  – appointed 21 August 1984
Lieutenant The Duke of Abercorn  – appointed 1 November 2000
Major General Sir Sebastian Roberts  – appointed 17 March 2008
Major The Prince of Wales  – appointed 10 February 2011
The Princess of Wales  – appointed 21 December 2022

Regimental Lieutenant Colonels

The Regimental Lieutenant Colonels have included:
 1900–1905: Col. Vesey John Dawson
 1905–1909: Col. Richard J. Cooper
 1909–1913: Col. George Colborne Nugent
 1913–1914: Col. Charles FitzClarence
 1914–1917: Col. Douglas J. Proby
 1917–1918: Col. Lord Ardee
 1918–1919: Col. Sir John R. Hall, 9th Baronet
 1919–1924: Col. Robert C. A. McCalmont
 1924–1928: Col. William H. V. Darell
 1928–1930: Col. The Hon. Harold R. L. G. Alexander
 1930–1931: Col. Robert V. Pollok
 1931–1935: Col. L. M. Gregson
 1935–1936: Col. A. G. C. Dawnay
 1936–1938: Col. J. S. N. Fitzgerald
 1938–1939: Col. R. Bruce S. Reford
 1939–?: Col. The Hon. T. E. Vesey
 1959–1961: Col. Henry L. S. Young
 1961–1964: Col. James W. Berridge
 1964–1966: Col. Michael J. P. O'Cock
 1966–1969: Col. Charles W. D. Harvey-Kelly
 1969–1972: Col. J. Anthony Aylmer
 1972–1973: Col. John G. F. Head
 1973–1976: Col. Prince J. N. Ghika
 1976–1979: Col. Giles A. Allan
 1979–1981: Col. Richard T. P. Hume
 1981–1985: Col. James H. Baker
 1985–1988: Col. Sir William W. Mahon, 7th Baronet
 1988–1991: Brig. Robert J. S. Corbett
 1991–1995: Brig. David B. W. Webb-Carter
 1995–1999: Brig. R. Christopher Wolverson
 1999–2008: Maj.-Gen. Sir Sebastian J. L. Roberts
 2008–2012: Maj.-Gen. Sir William G. Cubitt
 2012–2022: Gen. Sir Mark A. P. Carleton-Smith
 2022–present: Maj.-Gen. Christopher Ghika

Commanding Officers 
Commanding Officers have included (since 2001):

 2001–2003: Lt.-Col. James R. H. Stopford
 2003–2006: Lt.-Col. Charles P. H. Knaggs
 2006–2008: Lt.-Col. Michael G. C. O'Dwyer
 2008–2010: Lt.-Col. Benjamin C. Farrell
 2010–2012: Lt.-Col. Christopher Ghika
 2012–2014: Lt.-Col. Edward T. Boanas
 2014–2017: Lt.-Col. I. Alexander J. Turner
 2017–2019: Lt.-Col. Jonathan A. E. Palmer
 2019–present: Lt.-Col. Robert P. Money

Order of precedence

Alliances
 – 4th Battalion, Royal Australian Regiment
 – Royal Montserrat Defence Force
 – 13e Demi-Brigade de Légion Étrangère (Bond of Friendship)

The Irish Guards and other Guards regiments have a long-standing connection to The Parachute Regiment. Irish Guardsmen who have completed P Company can be seconded to the Guards Parachute Platoon, which is currently attached to the 3rd Battalion, The Parachute Regiment. The Guards Parachute Platoon maintains the tradition established by Number 1 (Guards) Independent Parachute Company that was part of the original Pathfinder Group of 16th Parachute Brigade, which has since been designated as the 16th Air Assault Brigade.

Notes

Citations

References
The Long, Long Trail – Irish Guards
Irish Guards.org.uk

External links

British Army – Irish Guards
The Guards Museum Containing the history of the five regiments of Foot Guards, Wellington Barracks, London.
Ex Irish Guards tribute site
British Army Locations from 1945 British Army Locations from 1945
Irish soldier is injured in Afghanistan blast

 
British ceremonial units
Guards regiments
Infantry regiments of the British Army
Military units and formations established in 1900
Regiments of the British Army in World War I
Regiments of the British Army in World War II
Irish regiments of the British Army
Military units and formations of the United Kingdom in the War in Afghanistan (2001–2021)
Military units and formations of the Iraq War
1900 establishments in the United Kingdom
Irish regiments